Norovo is a village in the municipality of Kruševo, North Macedonia.

Demographics
Norovo has traditionally and exclusively been populated by Muslim Albanians.

According to the 2021 census, the village had a total of 770 inhabitants. Ethnic groups in the village include:

Albanians 725
Others 45

References

External links

Villages in Kruševo Municipality
Albanian communities in North Macedonia